Irene Louise Rosnes (born 24 March 1962),  known professionally as Renee Rosnes, is a Canadian jazz pianist, composer, and arranger.

Early life
Rosnes was born in Regina, Saskatchewan, and grew up in North Vancouver, British Columbia, where she attended Handsworth Secondary School. She was three when she began taking classical piano lessons. She became interested in jazz music in high school, introduced to it through the school's band director Bob Rebagliati. She then attended the University of Toronto, where she pursued classical performance with pianist William Aide. In 1985, Rosnes was awarded a Canada Council for the Arts grant, and moved to New York City to further her studies.

Career
After tenor saxophonist Joe Henderson hired her to play with his quartet in 1986, Rosnes began an international career. In 1988, she was a member of the Wayne Shorter Band and in 1989, she joined trombonist J. J. Johnson's Quintet and remained his pianist of choice until he retired in 1997. In 1989, she also began working with tenor saxophonist James Moody and was the pianist in his quartet for the next 20 years. Rosnes frequently performed with vibraphonist Bobby Hutcherson, and recorded For Sentimental Reasons with his quartet in 2007. She was a founding member of the SFJAZZ Collective, and played with the octet from 2004 through 2009. Since 2012, she has been a member of bassist Ron Carter's Foursight Band, which tours frequently in Europe.

In 2017, Rosnes won her fifth Juno Award for solo jazz album of the year for Written in the Rocks Smoke Sessions Records. Beloved of the Sky was recorded with Steve Nelson on vibes, Chris Potter on tenor sax, Peter Washington on bass, and Lenny White on drums. She made four Japanese trio recordings for the VideoArts label with The Drummonds with ex-husband Billy Drummond and the unrelated Ray Drummond on bass. She married jazz pianist Bill Charlap on 25 August 2007, and the couple released a piano duet recording titled Double Portrait (Blue Note).

Rosnes was the host of Jazz Profiles, a CBC Radio show in which she profiled Canadian jazz musicians. Guests included pianists Paul Bley, Joe Sealy and Oliver Jones, bassists Don Thompson and Michel Donato, trumpeters Guido Basso and Kenny Wheeler, and drummer Terry Clarke. With producer Kelly Peterson Rosnes is a co-founder of the Canadian Jazz Master Awards and is artistic director of the Oscar Peterson International Jazz Festival, which takes place during February in Ontario, Canada. Rosnes is the pianist and musical director of the septet Artemis. The other members are  Ingrid Jensen (trumpet), Alexa Tarantino (alto sax & reeds), Anat Cohen (clarinet), Noriko Ueda (bass), Allison Miller (drums), and Cécile McLorin Salvant (vocals). The group signed with the Blue Note label, and their eponymously titled debut album was released on 11 September 2020.

Awards and honours
 Hugh Fraser (musician)'s tribute composition Irenerosnesity was recorded by The Hugh Fraser Quintet on their album Looking Up (CBC Records 1988) and performed by them at the Montreal Jazz Festival (1988)
 Juno Awards, Best Jazz Album, For the Moment (1992), Life on Earth (2003), Written in the Rocks (2017)
 Juno Awards, Best Mainstream Jazz Album, Free Trade (1995), Ancestors (1997)
 Juno nominations, Best Mainstream Jazz Album, As We Are Now (1998), Deep Cove (2005) (Ryga/Rosnes), 
 Juno nominations, Best Jazz Album, Renee Rosnes (1991), Art and Soul (2000), Beloved of the Sky (2018)
 SOCAN Composer of the Year, 2003
 Western Canadian Music Awards, Jazz Recording of the Year, Deep Cove by Ryga-Rosnes Quartet, (2005)
 Sikh Centennial Gala Award, Sikh Foundation of Canada, 2015 
 Newark School of the Arts, Artistic Honoree, 2016
 Oscar Peterson Award, Festival International de Jazz de Montréal, 2018

Discography

As leader 
 Face to Face (Toshiba/EMI, 1989)
 Renee Rosnes (Blue Note, 1990)
 For the Moment (Blue Note, 1990) with Joe Henderson
 Without Words (Blue Note, 1992)
 Ancestors (Blue Note, 1996)
 As We Are Now (Blue Note, 1997)
 Art & Soul (Blue Note, 1999)
 With a Little Help from My Friends (Blue Note, 2001)
 Life on Earth (Blue Note, 2002)
 Renee Rosnes and the Danish Radio Big Band (Blue Note, 2003) with DR Big Band
 Deep Cove (CBC, 2004)
 A Time for Love (Video Arts, 2005)
 Black Narcissus: A Tribute to Joe Henderson (Pony Canyon/M&I, 2009)
 Double Portrait (Blue Note, 2010) with Bill Charlap – recorded in 2009
 Manhattan Rain (Pony Canyon, 2012)
 Written in the Rocks (Smoke Sessions, 2016)
 Beloved of the Sky (Smoke Sessions, 2018)
 Ice on the Hudson: Songs by Renee Rosnes & David Hajdu (SMK Records, 2018)
 ARTEMIS (Blue Note, 2020) *release date 09/11/20
 Kinds of Love (Smoke Sessions, 2021)

As a member 
Out of the Blue
 Spiral Staircase (Blue Note, 1989)

Superblue
 Superblue 2 (Blue Note, 1989)

The Drummonds
With Ray Drummond, Billy Drummond
 When You Wish Upon a Star (VideoArts, 1999)
 Letter to Evans (VideoArts, 2000)
 A Beautiful Friendship (VideoArts, 2002)
 Pas de Trois (True Life Jazz, 2002)
 Once Upon a Summertime (VideoArts, 2003)

SFJAZZ Collective
 Inaugural Season Live 2004 (SFJAZZ, 2004)[3CD]
 Live 2005: 2nd Annual Concert Tour - The Works of John Coltrane (SFJAZZ, 2005)[2CD]
 Live 2006: 3rd Annual Concert Tour - The Music of Herbie Hancock (SFJAZZ, 2006)[2CD]
 Live 2007: 4th Annual Concert Tour - The Works of Thelonious Monk (SFJAZZ, 2007)[2CD]
 Live 2008: 5th Annual Concert Tour - The Works of Wayne Shorter (SFJAZZ, 2008)[3CD]
 Live 2009: 6th Annual Concert Tour - The Music of McCoy Tyner (SFJAZZ, 2009)[2CD]

As sideperson 

With Ron Carter
 Brasil L.I.K.E. with Vitoria Maldonado (Summit, 2016)
 Foursight Quartet: Live in Stockholm, Vol. 1 (In and Out, 2019) – rec. 2019-20

With Todd Coolman
 Tomorrows (BRC, 1991)
 Lexicon (Double-Time, 1995) – rec. 1991

With Michael Dease
 Coming Home (D Clef, 2013)
 All These Hands (Posi-Tone, 2016)
 Never More Here (Posi-Tone, 2019)

With Billy Drummond
Native Colours, (Criss Cross, 1992)
 The Gift (Criss Cross, 1993)

With Jon Faddis
 Into the Faddisphere (Epic, 1989)
 Hornucopia (Epic, 1991)

With Jimmy Greene
 Beautiful Life (Mack Avenue, 2014)
 Flowers, Beautiful Life, Volume 2 (Mack Avenue, 2017)

With Joe Henderson
 1986: Punjab (Arco, 1990)
 1988: Humpty Dumpty with Akio Sasajima (BRC, 1990)

With J. J. Johnson
 Let's Hang Out (Verve, 1993)
 The Brass Orchestra (Verve, 1997)
 Heroes (Verve, 1998)

With Marian McPartland
 Just Friends (Concord, 1998)
 An NPR Christmas Collection with Marian McPartland and Friends (NPR, 2006)

With Jimmy Scott
 But Beautiful (Milestone, 2002)
 Moon Glow (Milestone, 2003)

With Gary Thomas
 The Seventh Quadrant (Enja, 1987)
 While the Gate Is Open (JMT, 1990)

With Walt Weiskopf
 1998: Anytown (Criss Cross, 1999)
 2008: Quartet Live (Capri, 2011)

With Gerald Wilson
 New York, New Sound (Mack Avenue, 2003)
 In My Time (Mack Avenue, 2005)
 Monterey Moods (Mack Avenue, 2007)
 Detroit (Mack Avenue, 2009)
 Legacy (Mack Avenue, 2011)

With Dave Young
 Two by Two, Vol. 1 (Justin Time, 1995)
 Two by Two, Vol. 2 (Justin Time, 1996)
 One Way Up (Modica Music, 2016)
 Lotus Blossom (Modica Music, 2019)

With others
 Howard Alden, Take Your Pick (Concord, 1997) – rec. 1996
 Tony Bennett & Bill Charlap, The Silver Lining: The Songs of Jerome Kern (RPM/Columbia, 2015) – Grammy won album
 Adrian Cunningham and Ken Peplowski, Duologue (Arbors, 2018)
 Brandi Disterheft, Gratitude (Justin Time, 2012)
 Ray Drummond, Vignettes (Arabesque, 1996) – rec. 1995
 Robin Eubanks, Karma (JMT, 1991)
 Renée Fleming, Christmas in New York (Decca, 2014)
 Sonny Fortune, Invitation (Century, 2010) – rec. 1987
 Dizzy Gillespie All-Star Big Band, Things to Come (MCG Jazz, 2002)
 David Hajdu, Waiting for the Angel (Miranda, 2015)
 Slide Hampton, Inclusion (Twin, 1999) – rec. 1998
 Vincent Herring, Secret Love (MusicMasters, 1993)
 Bobby Hutcherson, For Sentimental Reasons (Kind of Blue, 2007)
 Joyce Moreno, Astronauta – The Songs of Elis (Blue Jackel, 1998)
 Steve Kaldestad, New York Afternoon (Cellar Jazz, 2015)
 Tom Kennedy, Just Play (Capri, 2013) – rec. 2012
 Peter Leitch, Blues on the Corner (Reservoir, 1999)
 Joe Magnarelli, Why Not (Criss Cross, 1995)
 George Mraz, Duke's Place (Milestone, 1999)
 Mike Murley, Taking Flight (Cornerstone, 2020)
 Lewis Nash, Highest Mountain (Cellar Live, 2011)
 Native Colors, One World (Concord, 1995)
 Greg Osby, Season of Renewal (JMT, 1990) – rec. 1989
 Niels-Henning Ørsted Pedersen, Friends Forever (Milestone, 1997) – rec. 1995
 Rich Perry, So in Love (Steeplechase, 1998) – rec. 1997
 Jim Snidero, Strings (Milestone, 2003) – rec. 2001

 Steve Turre, One4J (Telarc, 2003)
 Chip White, Personal Dedications & Percussive Tributes (Dark Colors, 2011)
 Nancy Wilson, A Nancy Wilson Christmas (Telarc, 2001)
 Pete Yellin, How Long Has This Been Going On? (Jazzed Media, 2009)
 Libby York, Sunday in New York (Blujazz Productions, 2004)

References

External links 
 
 Renee Rosnes discography at JazzDiscography.com
 Renee Rosnes - Topic at Youtube.com
 2015 Jazz Fest Round-Up: From Montreal to Wall Street at Jazz Police
 Michael Dease: Never More Here at Posi-Tone
 Ron Carter: Foursight - Stockholm Vol. 1 at In and Out Records

1962 births
Canadian adoptees
Canadian jazz composers
Canadian jazz pianists
Canadian women pianists
Hard bop pianists
Juno Award for Vocal Jazz Album of the Year winners
Living people
Musicians from New Jersey
Musicians from Regina, Saskatchewan
People from West Orange, New Jersey
Post-bop pianists
Women jazz pianists
Juno Award for Jazz Album of the Year – Solo winners
Juno Award for Best Jazz Album winners
Juno Award for Traditional Jazz Album of the Year winners
21st-century Canadian pianists
Out of the Blue (American band) members
SFJAZZ Collective members
Superblue (band) members
Blue Note Records artists
Smoke Sessions Records artists
Canadian women composers